This is a list of the 141 municipalities in the province of Alicante, in the autonomous community of Valencia, Spain.

See also
Geography of Spain
List of Spanish cities

References

Alicante